Andrew David Wooding Jones (born 17 August 1961) has been Archdeacon of Rochester since 2018.

Early life 
Wooding Jones was born on 17 August 1961 in Manchester. His parents are Gerald and Joan Wooding Jones. He was educated at The Skinners' School and received his HND in Hotel and Catering Administration from Huddersfield Polytechnic. In 1991, he was awarded a BA in Theology and Pastoral Studies from Oak Hill College and in 2001, he received an MBA in Church and Charity Management from the University of Hull.

Career 
He was ordained deacon in 1991, and priest 1992. After a curacy in Welling, he was Team Vicar of St Thomas’, Crookes from 1995 to 2000. He was Resident Director of the Ashburnham Christian Trust from 2000 to 2012. He held administrative positions with The World Prayer Centre, Birmingham, Incognito Sussex and Lee Abbey before his appointment as Archdeacon.

References

1961 births
Living people
Alumni of Oak Hill College
21st-century English Anglican priests
20th-century English Anglican priests
Alumni of the University of Huddersfield
Alumni of the University of Hull
People educated at The Skinners' School
Archdeacons of Rochester